Ali Mumcu  (born 1 January 1979 in Akçaabat) is a Turkish professional footballer who last played as a midfielder for Göztepe in the TFF Second League.

He formerly played for Kocaelispor, İzmitspor, Pendikspor, Erzurumspor, Arsinspor and Gölcükspor. He appeared in fourteen Süper Lig matches during the 1997–98 and 1999-00 seasons and two TFF First League matches during the 2004-05 season with Kocaelispor.

References

External links

1979 births
Living people
People from Akçaabat
Turkish footballers
Turkey youth international footballers
Süper Lig players
TFF First League players
Kocaelispor footballers
Erzurumspor footballers
Göztepe S.K. footballers
Pendikspor footballers
Association football midfielders